Abdourahman A. Waberi is a novelist, essayist, poet, academic and short-story writer from Djibouti.

Early life
Abdourahman Waberi was born in Djibouti City in the French Somali Coast, the current Republic of Djibouti. He went to France in 1985 to study English literature. Waberi worked as a literary consultant for Editions Le Serpent à plumes, Paris, and as a literary critic for Le Monde Diplomatique. He has been a member of the International Jury for the Lettre Ulysses Award for the Art of Reportage (Berlin, Germany), 2003 & 2004.

Career
Waberi worked as an English teacher at Caen, France, where he has lived for most of time since 1985. He was awarded with several honors including the Stefan-George-Preis 2006, Heinrich-Heine-Universität, the Grand prix littéraire d'Afrique noire in 1996 and the Prix biennal " Mandat pour la liberté " – offered by PEN France, 1998.  In 2005, he was chosen amongst the "50 Writers of Future" by French literary magazine Lire.

In 2006 to 2007, Waberi lived in Berlin as a guest of the DAAD. 
In 2007, he was a Donald and Susan Newhouse Center Humanities Fellow at Wellesley College, USA. His work is translated into more than ten languages. 
In 2007, Waberi participated in the international Stock Exchange of Visions project. 
In 2010, he was a William F. Podlich Distinguished Fellow and a visiting professor at Claremont McKenna College, California, a jury member of the International Dublin Literary Award and an Academie de France Villa Medici fellow in Roma, Italy. In May and June 2012, he was a visiting professor at the University of Innsbruck, Austria. His novel Transit was a finalist for the Best Translated Book Award (2013).
Nancy Naomi Carlson is a 2013 recipient of an NEA Literature Translation Fellowship for translating his book of poetry.
He teaches now French and Francophone Studies and Creative Writing at George Washington University, Washington DC.

Translated works
The Land Without Shadows (short-story collection), translated by Jeanne Garane, prefaced by Nuruddin Farah, University of Virginia Press, 2005
In The United States of Africa (novel), translation by David and Nicole Ball, prefaced by Percival Everett, University of Nebraska Press, March 2009.
Passage of Tears (novel), translation by David and Nicole Ball, Seagull Books, 2011.
Transit (novel), translation by David and Nicole Ball, Indiana University Press, 2012.
The Nomads, My Brothers, Go Out to Drink from the Big Dipper (poems), translated by Nancy Naomi Carlson, Seagull Books, 2015.
Naming the Dawn (poems), translated by Nancy Naomi Carlson, Seagull Books, 2018.

Bibliography
 Le Pays Sans Ombre ("The Land Without Shadow"), Serpent à plumes, Paris, 1994, 
 Balbala, Serpent à plumes, Paris 1998, 
 Cahier nomade ("Nomad's Book"), Serpent à plumes, Paris, 1999 
 L'oeil nomade ("Nomad's Eye"), CCFAR, Djibouti, 1997, 
 Les Nomades, mes frères vont boire à, la Grande Ourse ("The Nomads: My brothers go drinking in the Big Dipper")  Pierron, Sarreguemines 2000 et Mémoire d'encrier, Montréal, 2013. 
 Rift, routes, rails ("Rifts, Roads and Rails"), Gallimard, Paris 2001, 
 Transit, Gallimard, Paris 2003, 
 Moisson de crânes ("Harvest of Skulls"), Serpent à plumes, Paris 2004 
 Aux Etats Unis d'Afrique ("In the United States of Africa"), Lattès, Paris 2006 
 Passage des larmes ("Trail of Tears"), Lattès, Paris, 2009.
 Dis-moi pour qui j’existe ? (roman), Paris, Jean-Claude Lattès, 2022.

References

External links

 Official site (mostly in French)
 Brief biography (in English)
 Stock Exchange Of Visions: Visions of Waberi Abdourahman (Video Interviews)

 Webcast at the Library of Congress, 14 November 2013

Somalian writers
1965 births
Living people
Djiboutian writers
People from Djibouti (city)
Djiboutian writers in French